Chellowe is a historic plantation house located on county route 623 in Buckingham County, Virginia. The main house was built about 1820 and modified about 1840. It is a two-story, three part, frame dwelling with Gothic Revival and Classical Revival style detailing. It features a two-story tetrastyle portico with Chippendale railings. Also on the property are a contributing kitchen (c. 1800), office (c. 1840), and garden terraces developed in the 19th century.

It was listed on the National Register of Historic Places in 1999.

References

Plantation houses in Virginia
Houses on the National Register of Historic Places in Virginia
Carpenter Gothic houses in Virginia
Neoclassical architecture in Virginia
Houses completed in 1840
Houses in Buckingham County, Virginia
National Register of Historic Places in Buckingham County, Virginia